This Machine Is Made of People is a studio album by Australian blues and roots rock band Wild Pumpkins at Midnight. The album was released in August 1989. At the ARIA Music Awards of 1990, the album won the ARIA Award for Best Independent Release.

Track listing 
 Side A
 "Retrenchment Town"
 "Get On That Train"
 "Strange Disease"
 "Counting the Pennies"

 Side C
 "Only Five Days Until The Weekend"
 "The Gaiety"
 "This Machine Is Made of People"

References 

1990 albums
ARIA Award-winning albums